Rahel Aschwanden (born 21 October 1993) is a Swiss table tennis player. Her highest career ITTF ranking was 141.

References

1993 births
Living people
Swiss female table tennis players